The Ministry of Culture of Azerbaijan Republic is a governmental agency within the Cabinet of Azerbaijan in charge of regulation of the activities and promotion of Azerbaijani culture. The ministry is headed by Anar Karimov.

General information 
The ministry which is located in the capital of the country- Baku is funded mainly from the state budget. The Statute of the Ministry approved by the President determines the main directions, tasks, rights and organization of activity of this state body.

The institutions under the Ministry of Culture and Tourism of Azerbaijan include 28 theaters, 6308 historical and cultural monuments, 1 circus and 12 concert centers, 3985 libraries, 2708 clubs, 189 museums (with branches), 234 children's music schools, art and painting schools, 33 art galleries and exhibition hall, 21 state reserves, 60 cultural and leisure parks, 1 Zoo, a Scientific and Methodological Center for Culture, 4 Leisure Centers, 6 economic organizations, 7 film production studios, 134 city and district cinemas, tate Film Foundation (together with Nakhchivan branch), Republican Library College, newspaper (Culture), two magazines ("Cultural-educational" and "Window"), State Tourism Institute, Baku Choreography School, Cultural Staff Development Center, Mingachevir Tourism College, National Culinary Center, 62 cities and ray ten cultural and tourism departments, Ministry of Culture and Tourism of Nakhchivan Autonomous Republic, Baku, Ganja, Sumgayit tourism departments, Sheki Equestrian Center, Baku Tourism Information Center, Lankaran Children's Camp.

The Ministry carries out international cultural programs with the European, Asian and Islamic countries, the United States, as well as Latin America in line with interstate agreements of the Ministry. At the same time it promotes the culture of Azerbaijan through UN, GUAM, the Black Sea Economic Cooperation Organization, the European Union, the Organization of Islamic Conference, UNESCO, World Tourism Organization, TURKSOY, ISESCO and other international organizations, as well as promotion of world cultural values in Azerbaijan carries out significant programs in the field.

The activities of the Ministry include:

Participating in the formation of uniform state policy in the relevant field and ensures implementation of this policy;

Developing and implementing different programs aimed at the development of the relevant field.

History
The ministry was established in 18 April 1953 with a purpose of preservation, development, promotion of rich Azerbaijani culture and arts. The agency's included implementation of local and international cultural programs, projects and holding events in various countries. The objectives were to preserve and protect historical monuments and real estate, their renovation and use, modernization of libraries and museums, protection and promotion of Azerbaijani folklore, development of cultural clubs, resorts and parks, revitalization of tourism, development of theater, musical and other forms of arts, revitalization of cinema and book publications and so forth.

Organization
The ministry is headed by the minister with three deputy ministers. Main functions of the ministry are implementation of state policies in the tourism sector and promotion of Azerbaijani culture, formulation and implementation of short-, mid- and long-term strategies and programs, increasing activities in cultural sector among the youth, create conditions for every citizen to contribute to the cultural development in Azerbaijan, increase production of Azerbaijani films, etc.

Structure 
The structure of the Ministry consists of its apparatus and local and other local departments and together form a single system. The Ministry carries out its activities directly and through these institutions.

The structure of the Ministry is approved by the President of the Republic of Azerbaijan. The Ministry is headed by a minister who is appointed to office and dismissed by the President of the Republic of Azerbaijan. The Minister is personally responsible for the tasks entrusted to the Ministry.

The Ministry has 3 deputy ministers that also appointed and dismissed by the President of the Republic of Azerbaijan. The deputy ministers fulfill the duties entrusted to them by the minister and are personally responsible for them.

The Minister organizes and leads the activities of the Ministry by distributing responsibilities among its deputies, and determining the authorities of  them together with the officials of the ministry, and heads of the institutions included in the structure of the Ministry on cadre, financial, economic and other issues and ensuring the coordination among them;

The structure of the Ministry is composed of following institutions and departments:

 Ministerial Board
 Ministry Administration
 Arts Department
 Department for museum affairs and control over cultural resources
 Cinematography Department
 Department for folk art and cultural routes development
 Department for book circulation and work with publishing houses
 Department of regional policy
 International cooperation and innovative development Department
 Creative industries and digital development Department
 Department for civil service and personnel
 Economics Department
 Finance and accounting Department
 Department for law and internal control
 Department for work with documents and citizens applications
 Information and public relations Department
 Technical Supply and Property Management Department
 Protocol Division
 Division for science and research

State Service for Protection, Development and Restoration of Cultural Heritage 
State Service for Protection, Development and Restoration of Cultural Heritage is operating under Ministry of Culture. The service established according to the Decree No. 409 of the President of the Republic of Azerbaijan dated 18 December 2014. The service is the executive body exercising state control on usage of immovable historical and cultural monuments (except State Historical-Architecture of "Icheri Sheher" and “Qala” State Historical Ethnographic Reserve) that are under state protection, restoration, reconstruction and protection. The Service takes into account the Constitution of the Republic of Azerbaijan, international treaties to which the Republic of Azerbaijan is a party, laws of the Republic of Azerbaijan, decrees and orders of the President of the Republic of Azerbaijan, decrees and orders of the Cabinet of Ministers of the Republic of Azerbaijan, Regulations on the Ministry of Culture of the Republic of Azerbaijan, normative legal acts of the Ministry of Culture of the Republic of Azerbaijan, decisions, orders and orders of the Minister of Culture and its Statue while implementing its activities.

The duties of the Ministry 
The main duty of the Ministry is to protect of the culture of Azerbaijan. It preserves all the cultural heritage including the ancient and modern culture, as well as develops them. It fulfills different cultural programs, designs projects covering all the spheres of the culture, contribute cultural state policy, compile and control the activities of the cultural institutions under the Ministry.

The duties of the Ministry are:

 To carry out the normative regulation related to its competence by legislation in the relevant field;
 To ensure implementation of state programs and develop concepts within their competence;
 To coordinate the activities of other executive authorities in the relevant field, as well as the activities of the relevant bodies and associations;
 To protect human and civil rights and freedoms related to their activities, and prevent their violation;
 To ensure the application of scientific and technical achievements in the relevant field, taking into account international practices;
 To take necessary measures in order to protect the state secrets and confidentiality regime, as well as to take appropriate safeguards in line with their activities;
 To take measures aimed at the restoration, protection, development and promotion of the cultural heritage of Azerbaijan;
 To provide personnel training in the relevant field, as well as train specialists
 To take measures to improve the structure and performance of the Ministry;
 To support the professional development of talented individuals;
 To support the participation of international organizations, municipalities, individuals and legal entities, including non-profit organizations in cultural activities;
 To determine the procedure for the registration and storage of museum items and collections included in the museum fund of the Republic of Azerbaijan;
 Acquisition, protection, promotion and demonstration of culture materials and publication samples to enrich and package funds of state-owned museums, libraries, art galleries and exhibition halls
 To carry out the attraction of special cultural facilities (except for immovable cultural resources) to national cultural heritage sites;
 To maintain a list of protected cultural property (excluding immovable cultural resources);
 To ensure that the list of protected cultural property is posted on its official website and regularly updated and published in official publications.

Rights of the Ministry 
The Ministry of Culture of Azerbaijan has rights to prepare draft or draft legislation relating to the relevant field or participate in their preparation; to make an initiative to support  the relevant international agreements of Azerbaijan. It also may request the state and local self-government bodies, natural persons and legal entities on the relevant information (documents), cooperate with relevant international organizations, relevant state bodies (agencies) of foreign states in accordance with the legislation, to study relevant experience of foreign states. Analyzing relevant areas, making suggestions, taking measures to train specialists and increase their qualifications in the relevant field, involving independent experts and specialists in the scope of the funds intended for this purpose in the manner prescribed by law, approving the guidelines mandated by physical and legal persons in the cases specified by the legislation, taking measures to bring legal and physical persons to account in the manner prescribed by law for the violation of the rules of protection of historical and cultural monuments in the cases and in the manner prescribed by the legislation and carrying out monitoring in the relevant field are also include the rights of the Ministry.

Institutions included in the Ministry 
The Ministry includes the following organizations and institutions:

 All theaters in Azerbaijan
 Azerbaijan State Philharmonic Hall
 Azerbaijan State Symphony Orchestra
 Azerbaijan State Song and Dance Ensemble
 Azerbaijan State Dance Ensemble
 Azerbaijan State Chamber Orchestra
 Azerbaijan State Choir Chapel
 Azerbaijan national Children's Philharmonic
 Heydar Aliyev Palace
 Baku State Circus
 International Mugham Center of Azerbaijan
 Rashid Behbudov State Song Theatre
 Gaya Quartet
 Ganja State Philharmonic Hall
 Goy-Gol State Song and Dance Ensemble
 Azerbaijan State Orchestra of Folk Instruments
 National Library of Azerbaijan
 The Jafar Jabbarly Youth Library of Republic
 Children's Library named after Firidun bey Kocharli
 Republican Library for the Blind and Visually Impaired
 11 Centralized Library System
 All museums in Azerbaijan
 Baku Zoo

See also
Cabinet of Azerbaijan
Tourism in Azerbaijan
Culture of Azerbaijan
Architecture of Azerbaijan

References

Economy of Azerbaijan
Tourism in Azerbaijan
Azerbaijani culture
Culture and Tourism
Azerbaijan
Azerbaijan